Kouassi Yao Hermann (born 26 January 1990), known as Yao Hermann Kouassi and Hermann Yao Kouassi, is an Ivorian footballer who plays for Samutsongkhram in the Thai League 3 as a forward.

Career 
Hermann scored 16 goals for Air Force Central in 2013 as the club were promoted back to the Thai Premier League. On 9 March 2014, he made his debut in the Premier League and scored a consolation goal as Air Force were defeated 5−1 by Police United.

Yao Kouassi scored the game-winning goal for Air Force Central on 17 May 2014, as the club came from 0−1 down to win 2−1. On 31 May, he scored Air Force's second goal in their 2−0 win over Sisaket F.C. On 21 June, he brought his team back from a goal down, scoring a hat-trick to defeat Chainat Hornbill 3−1 in the 19th round of the Thai Premier League. On 23 July, Yao Kouassi scored Air Force's equalizer against Bangkok Glass but a late Suppasek Kaikaew strike won it 3−1 for the Pathum Thani club.

Career statistics

Honours

Club
Air Force Central
Thailand Division 1 League 
Champions (1): 2013

References

External links 
EuroSport Asia profile

Thaileague Official Website: Samutsongkhram F.C. Players

1990 births
Living people
Ivorian footballers
Association football forwards
Kouassi Yao Hermann
Kouassi Yao Hermann
Kouassi Yao Hermann
Ivorian expatriate footballers
Ivorian expatriate sportspeople in Thailand
Expatriate footballers in Thailand